Journey to the End of the Knife is the fourth studio album by the noise rock band The Heroine Sheiks. The title and cover art are inspired by the novel Journey to the End of the Night (1932) by Louis-Ferdinand Céline.

Track listing 
"Be a Man" - 2:42
"Hank's Pimp" - 2:23
"Four F" - 3:44
"Muerte Vous" - 3:32
"Co-Angle Phenomenon" - 3:54
"J. Edgar" - 3:44
"Let Me Out" - 4:35
"You Don't Want Me?" (live) - 3:04

Credits 
 Paul Sanders – guitar
 Shannon Selberg – vocals, bugle
 Jesse Kwakenat – bass guitar
 Sarah Huska – keyboard
 Bruce J Wuollet – drums

Engineered by Jeremy Tappero at the Office Studios in St. Paul, Minnesota

The Heroine Sheiks albums
2000 albums
Amphetamine Reptile Records albums